Hawkgirl is the name of several superheroines appearing in American comic books published by DC Comics. The original Hawkgirl, Shiera Sanders Hall, was created by writer Gardner Fox and artist Dennis Neville, and first appeared in Flash Comics #1 (January 1940). Shayera Hol was created by writer Gardner Fox and artist Joe Kubert, and first appeared in The Brave and the Bold #34 (March 1961). Kendra Saunders was created by writer David S. Goyer and artist Stephen Sadowski, and first appeared in JSA: Secret Files and Origins #1 (August 1999). One of DC's earliest super-heroines, Hawkgirl has appeared in many of the company's flagship team-up titles including Justice Society of America and Justice League of America.

Several incarnations of Hawkgirl have appeared in DC Comics, all of them characterized by the use of archaic weaponry and artificial wings, attached to a harness made from the special Nth metal that allows flight. Most incarnations of Hawkgirl work closely with a partner/romantic interest Hawkman.

Since DC's continuity was rewritten in the 1985 series Crisis on Infinite Earths, Hawkgirl's history has become muddled with several new versions of the character appearing throughout the years, some associated with ancient Egypt and some with the fictional planet Thanagar. These versions of the character have starred in several series of various durations.

Hawkgirl has been adapted into various media, including direct-to-video animated films, video games, and both live-action and animated television series, featuring as a main or recurring character in the shows Justice League, Justice League Unlimited, The Flash, Arrow, Young Justice, DC Super Hero Girls and Legends of Tomorrow. Ciara Renée portrayed the character in live action in the Arrowverse shows.

Publication history

Golden Age
Created by writer Gardner Fox and artist Dennis Neville, Shiera Sanders first appeared in Flash Comics #1 (January 1940), in the same 12-page story in which Fox and Neville introduced Hawkman. Shiera first appears as Hawkgirl in All Star Comics #5 (July 1941), in a costume created by Sheldon Moldoff, based on Neville's Hawkman costume.

Silver Age

With the fading popularity of superheroes during the late 1940s, the Hawkman feature ended in the last issue of Flash Comics in 1949. In 1956, DC Comics resurrected the Flash by revamping the character with a new identity and backstory. Following the success of the new Flash, DC Comics revamped Hawkman in a similar fashion with The Brave and the Bold #34 in 1961. The Silver Age versions of Hawkman and Hawkgirl became married Thanagarian police officers from the planet Thanagar who come to Earth to study police techniques. Silver Age Hawkgirl is introduced as Shayera Hol (phonetically identical to Shiera Hall), who appears in costume as of her first appearance. Although Silver Age Hawkman joins the Justice League in Justice League of America #31 in 1964, Silver Age Hawkgirl was not offered membership because Justice League rules only allowed for one new member to be admitted at a time. In 1981, Silver Age Hawkgirl changed her name to Hawkwoman in the Hawkman backup feature of World's Finest Comics #274.

With the establishment of DC's multiverse system, the Golden Age Hawkgirl was said to have lived on Earth-Two and the Silver Age Hawkgirl on Earth-One.

Post-Crisis and One Year Later
Following the events of DC's miniseries, Crisis on Infinite Earths, the histories of Earth-One, Two, Four, S, and X were merged into one single Earth with a consistent past, present, and future. As a result, both the Golden Age and the Silver Age versions of Hawkman and Hawkgirl live on the same Earth. Shortly after Crisis on Infinite Earths, DC decided that having the Justice Society on the same Earth as all of the other superheroes was redundant and most of the team, including Golden Age Hawkman and Hawkgirl were given a sendoff in the Last Days of the Justice Society one-shot. The Justice Society were trapped in another dimension, Limbo, where they would battle for all of eternity to prevent Ragnarök from occurring on the Earth.

Initially, the Silver Age Hawkman and Hawkwoman were kept in continuity unchanged after Crisis on Infinite Earths. However, DC reversed this decision and rebooted Hawkman continuity after the success of the Hawkworld miniseries. Originally, Hawkworld was a miniseries set in the past that revised the origins of Hawkman and Hawkwoman, but after the series became a success, DC Comics made Hawkworld an ongoing series set in the present, with both heroes only recently appearing on Earth after the events in the Invasion! miniseries, resulting in a complete reboot of Hawkman continuity. Several continuity errors regarding Hawkman and Hawkgirl's Justice League appearances then needed to be fixed, including their appearance in the Invasion! miniseries. All previous appearances by the Silver Age Hawkgirl in the Justice League were explained by the Golden Age Hawkgirl taking the Silver Age Hawkgirl's place. However, Hawkwoman continued to appear in some pre-Hawkworld Justice League adventures during the time Golden Age Hawkgirl was trapped in Limbo. To explain this continuity error, a new Hawkwoman, Sharon Parker, was created and retconned into the Justice League during the time Golden Age Hawkgirl was in Limbo.

After the Hawkworld reboot, Hawkgirl (Hawkwoman) was now Shayera Thal and not married to Katar Hol, instead merely his police partner. In post-Hawkworld continuity, Shayera adopts the name Hawkwoman from the very beginning of her costumed career and never uses the name Hawkgirl. The Golden Age Hawkgirl is eventually returned from Limbo, but during the Zero Hour miniseries she is merged with Katar Hol and Golden Age Hawkman into a new persona.

A new Hawkgirl was introduced as part of the 1999 revival of the JSA monthly title. The new Hawkgirl is Kendra Saunders, granddaughter of the Golden Age Hawkgirl's cousin, Speed Saunders. Hawkgirl would continue to appear regularly in the monthly JSA series and later in the Hawkman monthly. In 2006, the ongoing Hawkman monthly series was retitled Hawkgirl starting with issue #50 as part of the "One Year Later" jump forward; Kendra replaced Hawkman as the lead character. The Hawkgirl comic book series was finished with issue #66.

Fictional character biographies

Shiera Sanders Hall
The Golden Age Hawkgirl was Shiera Sanders Hall, the reincarnation of the Egyptian princess Chay-Ara, and partner of Carter Hall, the Golden Age Hawkman.

Shayera Hol

Kendra Saunders
 
Kendra Saunders was a young Hispanic woman who took her own life. When Kendra's soul left her body, that of her grandfather's first cousin Shiera Hall, the Golden Age Hawkgirl entered it, making Kendra a walk-in. Her grandfather, former OSS agent and globe-trotting adventurer Speed Saunders, recognized this, in part due to a change in eye color, and encouraged his granddaughter to embrace her destiny as the "new" Hawkgirl.

Powers and abilities
Hawkgirl owes her powers to a belt of Nth metal, a substance native to the planet Thanagar (once home of another pair of Hawk-heroes, Katar Hol and Hawkwoman). The metal is psycho-reactive, responding to its bearer's thoughts and in its base form has a number of electromagnetic/gravitational properties. To the Hawks, it grants the power of flight, superhuman strength, super-acute vision, and an enhanced healing/regeneration ability.

Additionally, she displays advanced hand-to-hand combat skills. Like Hawkman, she retains the knowledge of several lifetimes worth of fighting. Her preferred weapons are a spear or mace, but she has also been depicted using swords, axes, warhammers, shields, and other melee weapons. She possesses shooting skills from her times as the gunfighter, Cinnamon.

In addition, the Nth metal knife which murdered Hawkgirl in her original incarnation as Chay-Ara had an unusual effect upon her soul and that of her lover Khufu (Hawkman). The pair are locked in a seemingly endless cycle of death and rebirth throughout the centuries. While not a superhuman power per se, this propensity for reincarnation has allowed Hawkgirl to cheat death and return to active duty in her current incarnation.

Like all modern Thanagarians, Shayera Hol has a pair of wings growing from her back which allows her to fly. As a Thanagarian, she has considerable physical strength, endurance and durability.
As a former member of the Thanagarian military, she had extensive training in tactics, military science, and personal combat skills. Additionally, her focus in espionage can make her a difficult opponent to track, and provides her with an advantage when tracking villains.

Hawkgirl carries a mace made of Nth metal, which can generate electric currents and repel magical energies, her mace is highly effective against magic, as shown when Hawkgirl defeated Doctor Fate, a powerful magician of the DC Universe. Hawkgirl is skilled at wielding and throwing the mace accurately. She has creatively used the mace as a shield to deflect incoming projectiles as well as a makeshift defibrillator unit.

Hawkgirl is fluent in many Earth languages, through the use of the Absorbascon. Her unique Thanagarian physiology also enables her to verbally communicate with birds.

The Nth metal also regulates the body temperature of the wearer, preventing the need for heavy protective clothing while in high altitudes. It also has the property of radiating heat, which can be controlled to warm the wearer in colder climates.

Recently, Kendra has discovered that she had enhanced healing, strength, vision and limited hover abilities when not wearing Nth metal. She speculates that this is due to her prolonged exposure to the substance. It remains to be seen if she still possesses these abilities now that she is Shiera Hall once again.

Other versions

Flashpoint
In the alternate timeline of the Flashpoint event, Hawkgirl joined with the Amazons' Furies. Later, Hawkgirl is seen aiding Artemis in her attempt to kill the Resistance movement member, Lois Lane. Although, Lois is rescued by Resistance member Penny Black using the smoke grenades, Penny is seriously wounded. Later, when the Furies attack Grifter and the Resistance, Hawkgirl pins Grifter down, but he pulls Hawkgirl down and then stabs her chest with a trench knife.

DC Bombshells
In the DC Bombshells continuity set in World War II, Shiera is a technological genius and archaeologist who aids the Bombshells with her lover, Vixen. As Hawkgirl, she uses a jetpack rather than fly with wings, though when Cheetah forces her to build weapons out of ancient technology, she designs one with wings as well as a powerful mace.

Shiera grew up in an orphanage in Mexico. From a young age she had a passion for history and ancient cultures, as well as the magnificent structures that they built. She became an archaeologist and her work caught the eye of Hans Garber. He informed her of the Zambesi Amulets and the power that they possessed.

Intrigued, Shiera went to Zambesi to try to discover the secret of the amulets. There she met Queen Mari of Zambesi and the two of them fell in love. Shiera stayed in Zambesi with Mari and became her personal mechanic, building gadgets to assist Mari against her enemies.

Hawkgirl discovered her true Thanagarian origins while fighting against Baroness Paula von Gunther. After connecting herself with an ancient mechanic god it was revealed to Shiera that her parents were members of the Wingmen of Thanagar, they sought to warn the humans of the intentions of Thanagar who wished to conquer the Earth; due to their actions they were captured and murdered.

Elseworlds 
Shayera and Katar are featured in the Elseworlds three-part series Legend of the Hawkman (2000). The story takes place in the Earth-One timeline, some time after The Brave and the Bold #34. She is shown wanting to return home to Thanagar while Katar has grown accustomed to life on Earth. Although this mini-series was never labelled as an Elseworlds project when originally published, it is now accepted as being one, with this story clearly based on the Silver Age versions of Hawkman and Hawkgirl during the pre-Crisis on Infinite Earths era.

Legend of the Hawkman
Hawkgirl (Shayera Hol) and Hawkman feature in this mini-series set soon after their arrival on Earth as the duo faces an ancient menace with connections to their Thanagarian heritage. In the first chapter, "The Fallen One", Shayera has been anxious to return to Thanagar, but Katar feels a responsibility to the museum, especially its upcoming extraterrestrial treasure exhibit. While Katar has adopted Earth as his home Shayera doesn't feel like they belong there. In Tibet a group of archaeologists discovers a Thanagarian gateway carved into a cliff side, after being informed of this Hawkgirl and Hawkman travel to the location.

Hawkman deciphers the writing on the gateway and it depicts the life of Thasaro, a Thanagarian child so evil that he threatened the existence of Thanagar's ancient gods. The ancient gods of Aerie condemned Thasaro into a mystic urn. Shayera's ancestor was entrusted with burying the urn so no one could release Thasaro. The archeologists and Katar want to examine the gateway but Shayera insists that the gateway be left alone. Hawkman and Shayera get into a fight until Shayera flies away heartbroken because Katar cares more about archeology than her feelings. Katar's fingerprints genetically open the gateway. Shayera hears an explosion and heads back to the site. Thasaro appears and makes the stone sentries throughout his chamber come to life. The sentries attack Hawkgirl but she manages to defeat his enforcers and finds Katar within Thasaro's grip. Thasaro then summons corpses like talons that rise up from the ground and pull Hawkgirl into a cavern beneath Thasaro's chamber. The talons maim Hawkgirl, but she manages to break away. Shayera's distress in the cavern awakens the spirit of her ancestor. Shayera's ancestor channels his aura into Shayera and gives her the edge she needs to subdue Thasaro. Thasaro is banished once again into the urn. The urn is then transported to the Midway City Museum so Katar and Shayera can safeguard it. Three months later Shayera is shown wanting to start a family, in the meantime Thanagarian zealots return to Earth to free the heinous fallen god. Thasaro's return brings chaos and devastation to Midway City, but using their Nth Metal weapons Hawkgirl and Hawkman are able to subdue him, banishing him to the fiery depths of Earth's Hell.

JLA: The Nail & JLA: Another Nail
In JLA: The Nail and JLA: Another Nail, Hawkgirl is a member of a Justice League, and remains so even after her husband's death by Amazo, although the team faces anti-alien prejudice and suspicion. She briefly contemplates abandoning Earth when anti-alien propaganda leads to a museum exhibit dedicated to Hawkman being vandalized, but when she returns to save two children from a burning building, her faith in humanity is restored when a group of civilians stand between her and government officials attempting to bring her in as an alien, the family she saved affirming that they still see Hawkman and her as heroes. In Another Nail, she appears to be close friends with Zatanna. She has forgiven Oliver Queen (in Amazo's body) after he admits feeling responsible for getting Katar killed, Queen believing that his attempts to prove himself caused Hawkman to put himself in danger to project the more vulnerable Oliver. Her role as the sole Hawk with League membership is much like her animated counterpart in the Justice League animated series.

Batman: The Dark Knight Strikes Again
In Batman: The Dark Knight Strikes Again, the Hawks tried to return to Thanagar to flee from Lex Luthor's military dictatorship, only to crash in the rain forests of Costa Rica. They decided to remain in hiding. They gave birth to a son and daughter, giving them natural wings. Katar and Shayera were killed in a military strike ordered by Lex Luthor, embracing each other in their final moments. The children were brought up in the jungle ever since. They were bent on revenge against Lex. As Hawkboy, the son ultimately kills Lex with Batman's permission, since he understands what he has been through.

Justice
In Alex Ross's Silver Age-toned Justice, Hawkgirl is a member of the Justice League and co-director of the Midway City Museum, alongside her husband. With the entire JLA's secrets and weaknesses in hand, the Legion of Doom stages a simultaneous attack on nearly every member of the League. Hawkgirl and Hawkman are surprised by Toyman in the Midway City Museum, but manage to survive and decide to investigate his warehouse, where they are assaulted by his forces, and discover that he is making multiple Brainiac androids. She also appears in Secret Origins and Liberty and Justice.

Gotham City Garage
Kendra Saunders's version of Hawkgirl is featured in Gotham City Garage series. She is the youngest member of a very old team. It's revealed that Kendra's parents were killed during an alien invasion, she was later rescued by the Blackhawks and trained from a young age with captain Blackhawk. She is shown using the Lady Blackhawk costume and the alias Kendra Blackhawk. She resigns from the Blackhawks to help the Gotham City Garage against Lex Luthor's attacks.

DC New Talents Showcase
Hawkgirl was chosen for one of the seven features in the one-shot comic book. She lives in Chicago, working as a police detective. She is from Thanagar, her mace vibrates like a smartphone when Nth-Metal Thanagarian weapons are near and she has a secret Hawkroom. It is revealed that she did not leave Thanagar on good terms. After some time collecting Thanagarian weapons from crime scenes, she started suspecting something was wrong. This led to her fighting against an ancient Thanagarian that wanted her dead since she chose humans instead of Thanagarians.

Erica Schultz, said she was inspired by the DC Animated Universe version of the character: "I've always been drawn to strong characters, but what really solidified my love for Shayera was the Justice League cartoon show."

Scooby-Doo Team-Up #17
During a crossover with the cast of Scooby-Doo, the Silver Age version of Hawkgirl is featured alongside Hawkman in the Midway City Museum, working as curators. The heroes team-up with the characters from the animated series to discover who stole from their workplace. Later they uncover that Shadow Thief, Matter Master and Fadeaway Man were behind it. After a fight against the villains the heroes retrieve the stolen items.

Bombshells: United
Hawkgirl appears as Shiera Hall in the continuation series to DC Comics Bombshells, Bombshells: United set in the United States in 1943. Shiera is shown in Zambesi alongside her lover, Vixen. Hawkgirl is later featured fighting against the Apokolips invasion on Earth.

In other media

Television

Animation

 The Shayera Hol incarnation of Hawkgirl appears in The All-New Super Friends Hour, voiced by Shannon Farnon.
 The Shayera Hol incarnation of Hawkgirl appears in Super Friends, voiced by Janet Waldo.
 The Shayera Hol incarnation of Hawkgirl appears in series set in the DC Animated Universe (DCAU), voiced by Maria Canals-Barrera.
 The Shiera Sanders Hall incarnation of Hawkgirl appears in the DC Super Hero Girls episode "#TheBirdAndTheBee", voiced by Stephanie Lemelin.
 An unidentified Hawkgirl makes a cameo appearance in "Harley Quinn: A Very Problematic Valentine’s Day Special", voiced by Quinta Brunson.

Live-action
 The Shiera Sanders Hall incarnation of Hawkgirl appeared in Smallville, portrayed by Sahar Biniaz.
 The Kendra Saunders incarnation of Hawkgirl, with elements of Shiera Sanders Hall, appears in media set in the Arrowverse, portrayed by Ciara Renée.
 The Shiera Sanders Hall incarnation of Hawkgirl appears in Stargirl.

Film
 Shayera Hol makes a cameo appearance in Justice League: The New Frontier.
 An evil, alternate universe version of Hawkgirl called Angelique makes a non-speaking cameo appearance in Justice League: Crisis on Two Earths as a minor member of the Crime Syndicate who wields a flaming sword.
 The Kendra Saunders incarnation of Hawkgirl appears in The Lego Batman Movie.
 The Shayera Hol incarnation of Hawkgirl appears in Teen Titans Go! To the Movies.
 The Shayera Hol incarnation of Hawkgirl was originally going to appear in the DC Extended Universe film Black Adam, but Dwayne Johnson later stated that she would not be in it.
 The Shayera Hol incarnation of Hawkgirl appears in Green Lantern: Beware My Power, voiced by Jamie Gray Hyder.

Video games

 The Shayera Hol incarnation of Hawkgirl appears as a playable character in Justice League: Injustice for All.
 The Shayera Hol incarnation of Hawkgirl appears as a playable character in Justice League: Chronicles.
 The Kendra Saunders incarnation of Hawkgirl appears as a playable character in Justice League Heroes, voiced by Collette Whittaker.
 The Kendra Saunders incarnation of Hawkgirl appears in DC Universe Online, voiced by Lana Lesley.
 The Shayera Hol incarnation of Hawkgirl appears as a playable character in Lego Batman 2: DC Super Heroes, voiced by Kari Wahlgren.
 The Shiera Sanders Hall incarnation of Hawkgirl appears as a playable character in Injustice: Gods Among Us, voiced by Jennifer Hale.
 The Shayera Hol incarnation of Hawkgirl appears as a playable character in Lego Batman 3: Beyond Gotham, voiced again by Kari Wahlgren.
 Hawkgirl appears as a playable character in Infinite Crisis, voiced again by Maria Canals-Barrera.
 Hawkgirl appears as a playable character in DC Legends.
 The Shayera Hol incarnation of Hawkgirl appears as a modifier in Injustice 2s "Multiverse" mode.
 The Shayera Hol incarnation of Hawkgirl appears as a playable character in Lego DC Super-Villains, voiced by Tiffany Smith.

Miscellaneous
 The DCAU incarnation of Shayera Hol / Hawkgirl appears in Justice League Beyond, Justice League Adventures, and the Justice League Unlimited tie-in comic book.
 The Shayera Hol incarnation of Hawkgirl appears in All-New Batman: The Brave and the Bold
 The Injustice incarnation of Shiera Sanders Hall / Hawkgirl appears in the Injustice: Gods Among Us prequel comic.
 The Kendra Saunders incarnation of Hawkgirl appears in DC Super Hero Girls, voiced by Nika Futterman.
 The Kendra Saunders incarnation of Hawkgirl appears in DC Super Hero High, voiced again by Nika Futterman.
 The Kendra Saunders incarnation of Hawkgirl appears in the DC Super Hero Girls tie-in comic book.

Reception
IGN's list of the "Top 25 Heroes of DC Comics" ranked Hawkgirl as #22. She was ranked 80th in Comics Buyer's Guide's "100 Sexiest Women in Comics" list.

See also
Hawkwoman

References

External links
 Hawkman and Hawkgirl on DC Comics.
 Hawkgirl on DC Comics Wiki
 Hawkgirl on DC Comics

 
All-American Publications characters
Characters created by Gardner Fox
Characters created by David S. Goyer
Characters created by Sheldon Moldoff
Characters created by Dennis Neville
Characters created by James Robinson
Comics characters introduced in 1940
Comics characters introduced in 1941
Comics characters introduced in 1999
Comics spin-offs
DC Comics fantasy characters
DC Comics titles
DC Comics American superheroes
DC Comics characters with accelerated healing
DC Comics characters with superhuman senses
DC Comics characters with superhuman strength
DC Comics extraterrestrial superheroes
DC Comics female superheroes
Earth-Two
Egyptian superheroes
Egyptian mythology in comics
Fictional archaeologists
Fictional characters with death or rebirth abilities
Fictional characters with immortality
Fictional princesses
Golden Age superheroes
Fiction about reincarnation
Wingmen of Thanagar